The 1954 Bari Grand Prix was a non-championship Formula One motor race held on 22 May 1954 on a street circuit in Bari, Apulia, Italy. The Grand Prix was won by José Froilán González in a Ferrari 625. González also took pole position. Maurice Trintignant finished second in another Ferrari 625 and Jean Behra was third in  a Gordini T16. Fastest lap was set by Onofre Marimón in a Maserati 250F.

Classification

Race

References

Bari Grand Prix
Bari
1954 in Italian motorsport